The 2010 Green Bay Packers season was the 92nd season overall and their 90th season in the National Football League (NFL). Although they finished with only a respectable 10–6 record, good for a second-place finish in the NFC North, the Packers never lost a game by more than four points, and never trailed by more than seven the entire season, becoming the only team since the AFL-NFL merger in 1970 to accomplish this. All six of their regular season losses were by a combined 20 points. They entered the playoffs as the NFC's sixth seed. After defeating the Philadelphia Eagles 21–16 in the wild-card round, the Atlanta Falcons 48–21 in the Divisional round, and long time rivals Chicago Bears 21–14 in the NFC Championship, the team advanced to Super Bowl XLV in which they faced the AFC's 2nd seed Pittsburgh Steelers. The Packers defeated the Steelers 31–25 to win their fourth Super Bowl and 13th NFL championship. The Packers became the second overall team after the 2005 Pittsburgh Steelers, and the first NFC team, to win the Super Bowl as a sixth seed, as well as becoming the second NFC team to win three straight road playoff games (the 2007 New York Giants won three straight road games as a five seed).

The Packers offense ranked ninth in yards per game, tenth in total points, & fifth in passing yards. The defense ranked fifth in yards allowed and finished second in points allowed (240), sacks (47), and interceptions (24), while also limiting quarterbacks to a 67.2 passer rating, first in the league.

Offseason

2010 NFL draft 

After finishing the 2009 season with an 11–5 record, the Packers held the 23rd selection in the 2010 NFL draft. With the pick they selected Offensive tackle Bryan Bulaga from Iowa.

On the second day of the draft, with pick 2–56 the Packers selected Defensive end Mike Neal from Purdue. The Packers then traded picks 3–86 and 4–122 to the Philadelphia Eagles for pick 3–71. With pick 3–71, the Packers selected Safety Morgan Burnett from Georgia Tech.

On the third and final day of the draft, with pick 5–154 the Packers selected Tight end Andrew Quarless from Penn State. With their compensatory selection pick 5–169, the Packers selected Offensive guard Marshall Newhouse from Texas Christian. In the sixth round with pick 6–193, the Packers selected Running back James Starks from Buffalo. Their final selection of the draft came when the Packers selected Defensive end C. J. Wilson of East Carolina with pick 7–230.

 The Packers were awarded a 5th round pick (5–169) for their loss of DT Colin Cole in the 2009 free agency period.

Draft pick trades
 During the 2010 NFL draft, The Packers traded picks 3–86 and 4–122 to the Philadelphia Eagles for pick 3–71.

Undrafted free agents
Following the 2010 NFL draft, the Packers signed 11 undrafted free agents. They were:

On May 3, the Packers signed wide receiver Shawn Gore, safety Anthony Levine  and nose tackle Aleric Mullins after they attended a minicamp on a tryout basis.

Additions
On March 9, former Indianapolis Colts WR Charles Dillon was signed to a contract.
On March 16, former Australian Football League P Chris Bryan was signed to a contract.
On April 26, S Charlie Peprah was signed to a contract.
On May 20, QB Graham Harrell was signed to a contract.
On August 5, WR Jason Chery was signed to a contract.
On August 10, LB Maurice Simpkins was signed to a contract.
On September 6, QB Graham Harrell, RB James Johnson, LB Robert Francois, WR Chastin West, T Chris Campbell, LB Maurice Simpkins, S Anthony Levine and T Breno Giacomini were signed to practice squad a day after they were all cut from the active roster and cleared waivers.

Departures
On May 12, G Stanley Daniels was released.
On March 5, S Matt Giordano and DE Michael Montgomery were released.
On March 7, the Jacksonville Jaguars signed DE Aaron Kampman to a contract.
On April 26, LB Jeremy Thompson was released.
On April 26, TE Devin Frischknecht was released.
On May 20, QB Chris Pizzotti was released.
On June 18, CB Trevor Ford, S Khalil Jones, LB Tim Knicky and QB Noah Shepard were released.
On July 30, LB John Russell was released.
On August 28, WR Shawn Gore was released.
On September 4, LB Maurice Simpkins, DE Ronald Talley, NT Anthony Toribio, WR Chastin West, WR Patrick Williams, DE Jarius Wynn, P Chris Bryan, T Chris Campbell, WR Jason Chery, CB D. J. Clark, C/G Evan Dietrich-Smith, WR Charles Dillon, LB Robert Francois, T Breno Giacomini, QB Graham Harrell, TE Spencer Havner, LB Alex Joseph, S Anthony Levine, RB Kregg Lumpkin and LB Cyril Obiozor were all released.

Suspensions
On July 16, The NFL indefinitely suspended DE Johnny Jolly due to his July 8, 2008 second-degree felony charge for possession of at least 200 grams of codeine. He would eventually be reinstated on February 27, 2013, and go on to play another season for the Packers.

Training camp and preseason injuries
On July 30, Aleric Mullins was placed on the reserve/did not report list.
On August 5, WR Jeff Moturi was placed on injured reserve.
On August 10, CB Josh Bell was placed on injured reserve.
On August 31, S Atari Bigby, CB Al Harris and RB James Starks were all placed on the reserve/physically unable to perform list. RB Quinn Porter was placed on injured reserve.
On September 4, T Allen Barbre and S Will Blackmon were placed on injured reserve.

Free agents

Notes:
: Did not receive an exclusive rights/restricted free agent qualifying offer from the Packers and became an unrestricted free agent.

Coaching changes
On January 29, Mark Lovat was promoted to strength and conditioning coordinator, with Dave Redding being demoted to assistant strength and conditioning coach from a result of the departure of Mondray Gee.

Final roster

Coaching staff

Regular season

Regular-season transactions
On September 14, The Packers signed RB Dimitri Nance from the Atlanta Falcons practice squad and previously released DE Jarius Wynn. RB Ryan Grant and DE Justin Harrell were also placed on injured reserve.
On September 15, The Packers signed CB Josh Gordy to their practice squad; LB Robert Francois released from practice squad.
On September 23, The Packers signed LB Robert Francois to their practice squad; T Chris Campbell released from practice squad.
On September 29, The Packers signed T Chris Campbell  to practice squad.
On October 7, The Packers signed LB Maurice Simpkins to the active roster from the practice squad, LB Johnny Williams was signed to the practice squad and S Morgan Burnett was placed on injured reserve due to a knee injury.
On October 13, The Packers signed LB Robert Francois to the active roster from the practice squad, S Derrick Martin was placed on injured reserve, S Michaell Greco and LB Mike Rivera were both signed to the practice squad and LB Johnny Williams was released from the practice squad.
On October 15, The Packers signed DE Michael Montgomery and placed LB Nick Barnett on injured reserve with a wrist injury.
On October 18, The Packers traded a conditional draft pick in the 2011 NFL draft to the Jacksonville Jaguars for former 2009 preseason Packers safety Anthony Smith. TE Jermichael Finley was also placed on injured reserve with a knee injury.
On October 20, The Packers signed NT Jay Ross to the practice squad and released RB James Johnson from the practice squad.
On October 26, The Packers claimed LB Diyral Briggs off waivers from the Denver Broncos, signed free agent LB Matt Wilhelm, placed DE Mike Neal and LB Brady Poppinga on injured reserve and released LB Maurice Simpkins.
On October 27, The Packers signed LB Erik Walden.
On October 28, The Packers claimed NT Howard Green off waivers from the New York Jets and LB Brad Jones was placed on injured reserve with a shoulder injury.
On November 2, The Packers released DE Michael Montgomery.
On November 6, The Packers activated S Atari Bigby from the physically unable to perform list.
On November 7, The Packers released 2x Pro Bowl CB Al Harris after being on the physically unable to perform list for the season.
On November 9, The Packers activated RB James Starks from the physically unable to perform list and released LB Robert Francois.
On November 12, The Packers signed TE Spencer Havner and placed T Mark Tauscher on injured reserve.
On November 15, The Packers signed LB Robert Francois to the practice squad.
On November 30, The Packers placed LB Brandon Chillar and TE Spencer Havner on injured reserve.
On December 1, The Packers promoted LB Robert Francois and CB Josh Gordy from the practice squad to the active roster and signed WR Terrance Smith and LB Curtis Young to the practice squad.
On December 18, The Packers promoted QB Graham Harrell from the practice squad to the active roster and put S Anthony Smith on injured reserve.
On December 29, The Packers signed LB Cardia Jackson to the practice squad and released WR Terrance Smith.
On December 31, The Packers signed C Evan Dietrich-Smith to the active roster and placed OT Marshall Newhouse on injured reserve.
On January 20, The Packers signed WR Antonio Robinson to the practice squad and placed  S Anthony Levine on practice squad/injured reserve.

Starters on offense

Starters on defense and special teams

Schedule

Preseason

Regular season

Note: Intra-division opponents are in bold text.

Standings

Regular season summary

Week 1

    
    
    
    
    
    
    
    
    

The Packers began their season at Lincoln Financial Field against the Philadelphia Eagles, who were wearing throwback uniforms commemorating the 50th anniversary of the team's victory over the Packers in the 1960 NFL Championship Game.  Green Bay trailed in the first quarter as Eagles kicker David Akers made a 45-yard field goal.  The Packers would then take control in the second quarter as kicker Mason Crosby nailed a 49-yard field goal, followed by quarterback Aaron Rodgers completing a 6-yard touchdown pass to wide receiver Donald Driver.  Crosby would then end the half with a 56-yard field goal.

Eagles starting quarterback Kevin Kolb left the game with concussion at halftime, and was replaced by second-string quarterback Michael Vick for the remainder of the contest.

Philadelphia would respond in the third quarter as running back LeSean McCoy scored on a 12-yard touchdown run, yet Green Bay came right back with Rodgers finding wide receiver Greg Jennings on a 32-yard touchdown pass.  The Eagles tried to rally in the fourth quarter as quarterback Michael Vick completed a 17-yard touchdown pass to wide receiver Jeremy Maclin, followed by a 24-yard field goal from Akers.  Fortunately, the Packers' defense prevented any further progress stopping Michael Vick on a key 4th and 1 rush up the middle for no gain.

With the win, Green Bay not only began its season at 1–0, but also got its first victory in Philadelphia since 1962.

However, the Packers victory was not without cost. During the game, Justin Harrell injured his ACL and Ryan Grant injured his ankle. Both players were placed on injured reserve for the rest of the season.

Week 2

    
    
    
    
    
    
    

Hoping to continue their current winning streak, the Packers returned to Lambeau Field for their home opener, an interconference duel with the Buffalo Bills. In the 1st quarter Green Bay took the early lead as kicker Mason Crosby made two field goals from 44 and 24 yards. RB Brandon Jackson added a touchdown on a 1-yard run. The Bills then answered in the 2nd quarter when RB Fred Jackson scored a touchdown on a 3-yard run. In the third quarter the Packers increased their lead when WR Donald Driver hauled in a 7-yard touchdown pass from QB Aaron Rodgers, followed by Rodgers scrambling 9 yards to the endzone for a touchdown. The Packers continued to dominate in the fourth quarter when Rodgers completed a 30-yard touchdown pass to WR James Jones.

With the win, Green Bay improved their record to 2–0 on the season tied with the Chicago Bears for the division lead. Both the Minnesota Vikings and Detroit Lions fell to 0–2. Linebacker Clay Matthews became the first Packer and one of only eight players in NFL history to record at least 6 sacks in the first two weeks of the season.

Week 3

    
    
    
    
    
    
    

Coming off their home win over the Bills, the Packers traveled to Soldier Field for a Week 3 Monday night duel with their hated divisional rival, the Chicago Bears.  Green Bay would deliver the opening strike in the first quarter as quarterback Aaron Rodgers completed a 7-yard touchdown pass to wide receiver Greg Jennings.  The Packers would add onto their lead in the second quarter as kicker Mason Crosby got a 38-yard field goal.  Afterwards, the Bears would close out the half, as quarterback Jay Cutler found tight end Greg Olsen on a 9-yard touchdown run.  After a scoreless third quarter, Chicago took the lead in the fourth quarter as wide receiver Devin Hester returned a punt 62 yards for a touchdown.  Fortunately, Green Bay came right back with a 9-yard touchdown run from Rodgers.  However, the Bears' Robbie Gould scored two field goals, from 25 and 19 yards, the final points being set up by a James Jones fumble, to win the game for Chicago.

The Packers committed a franchise record 18 penalties in the game.

With the loss, the Packers fell to 2–1.

Week 4

    
    
    
    
    
    
    
    
    
    

Hoping to rebound from their loss to the Bears, the Packers played on home ground for an NFC North rivalry match against the Lions. The Packers took the lead in the 1st quarter when QB Aaron Rodgers made a 29-yard TD pass to WR Donald Driver. The Lions replied in the 2nd quarter with QB Shaun Hill making a 23-yard TD pass to WR Calvin Johnson. The Packers started to rally with Rodgers making a 13-yard TD pass to TE Jermichael Finley and then a 17-yard TD pass to WR Greg Jennings. The Lions cut the lead as QB Shaun Hill made a 21-yard TD pass to WR Calvin Johnson. The Packers continued to progress in the 3rd quarter when CB Charles Woodson returned an interception 48 yards into the endzone for a touchdown. The Lions tried to cut the lead with four field goals by kicker Jason Hanson. He kicked a 39 and a 52-yard field goal for the rest of the 3rd quarter, and then a 49 and a 24-yard field goal in the fourth. However, the Packers defense never allowed the Lions to take the lead and the offense ran out the clock behind fullback John Kuhn.

With the close win, the Packers improve to 3–1.

Week 5

    
    
    
    
    
    
    

Coming off their win over the Lions the Packers flew to FedExField for an NFC duel with the Redskins. In the first quarter the Packers took the lead as QB Aaron Rodgers completed a 5-yard TD pass to TE Donald Lee. This was followed in the 2nd quarter by kicker Mason Crosby hitting a 52-yard field goal. The Redskins replied with kicker Graham Gano getting a 26-yard field goal. Then in the third quarter Crosby made a 36-yard field goal to put the Packers up 13–3. The Redskins rallied to tie the game with QB Donovan McNabb completing a 48-yard TD pass to WR Anthony Armstrong, followed by Gano making a 45 yard-field goal. At overtime, the decision was made when Gano successfully put away a 33-yard field goal to give the Packers their second loss of this season.  Donovan McNabb would finish the game with 357 passing yards and run his career record against Green Bay to 6 wins and 1 loss.

With the loss, Green Bay fell to 3–2.

Week 6

    
    
    
    
    
    
    
    
    

For the second consecutive week the Packers lost by an overtime field goal, falling to 3–3 on the season.

Week 7

    
    
    
    
    
    
    
    

Trying to snap a two-game losing streak, the Packers stayed at home for a Week 7 NFC North Sunday night duel with the Minnesota Vikings, as quarterback Brett Favre made his return to Lambeau Field.  Green Bay delivered the opening punch in the first quarter as running back Brandon Jackson got a 1-yard touchdown run.  The Vikings answered with wide receiver Percy Harvin getting a 17-yard touchdown run.  In the second quarter, the Packers regained the lead as quarterback Aaron Rodgers finding tight end Andrew Quarless on a 9-yard touchdown pass.  Minnesota would take the lead with running back Adrian Peterson getting a 1-yard touchdown run, followed by kicker Ryan Longwell making a 28-yard field goal.

Green Bay regained the lead in the third quarter as Rodgers hooked up with wide receiver Greg Jennings on a 14-yard touchdown pass, followed by linebacker Desmond Bishop returning an interception 32 yards for a touchdown.  The Vikings answered with Favre completing a 4-yard touchdown pass to wide receiver Randy Moss.  Late in the 4th quarter, Favre led the Vikings to a last-minute drive to near the Packer 20 and nearly had a game-winning touchdown pass, but official review showed the receiver, Percy Harvin, did not have both feet in the end zone, therefore making the pass incomplete. The Vikings tried a game-winning pass on 4th down, but Favre's throw was high to Moss and the Packers held on to their first victory over their former QB.

With the win, Green Bay improved to 4–3.

Week 8

    
    
    

After finally beating former quarterback Brett Favre in Week 7, the Packers traveled to New Meadowlands Stadium in East Rutherford, NJ to take on the New York Jets. The Packers took a 3–0 lead on a Mason Crosby 20-yard field goal in the first quarter and held that lead until the fourth quarter. Crosby then hit two field goals in the fourth quarter (from 41 and 40 yards respectively) to seal the victory for the Packers. While Aaron Rodgers and the Packer offense sputtered against the vaunted Jet defense, Green Bay's defense excelled in stopping the NFL's second-ranked rushing offense and intercepted Jets quarterback Mark Sanchez twice.

The win improved the Packers to 5–3 and in first place in the NFC North.

Week 9

    
    
    
    
    
    
    
    

After winning against the New York Jets for the first time in the New York Area, the Green Bay Packers took on the lowly Dallas Cowboys. After a scoreless first quarter, the Packers offense that was limited to 9 points against the New York Jets, built a 28–0 lead before the Cowboys scored their only touchdown before the end of the first half. The Packers would score 17 more points in the second half before closing the game out 45–7 over the Dallas Cowboys. The Green Bay Packers intercepted Jon Kitna 3 times including one to Clay Matthews which would result in 62-yard touchdown, while Aaron Rodgers threw for 3 touchdowns. With the win, the Packers improved to 6–3.

Week 11

    
    
    
    
    
    

In the Packers last game ever against the Vikings with Brett Favre under center, the Packers blew out the Vikings in a 31–3 victory. Aaron Rodgers completed 22/31 passes for 301 yards, with 4 touchdown passes, no interception, and a season-high passer rating of 141.3.

Week 12

Week 13

Week 14

    
    

Green Bay lost to Detroit for the first time in 11 games against the Lions. Also, at the end of the 1st half, Aaron Rodgers suffered a concussion and wouldn't play the next week.

Week 15

Week 16

    
    
    
    
    
    
    
    
    
    

In week 16, the Green Bay Packers dominated the New York Giants, winning 45–17 in Lambeau Field.

Week 17

    
    
    

The Packers finished the 2010 regular season vs. the Chicago Bears at Lambeau Field. Going into the final Sunday of the season, the Packers needed a win or a New York Giants and a Tampa Bay Buccaneers loss to clinch the sixth and final NFC wild-card seed. The Bears, on the other hand, had the NFC North Division title and the number 2 NFC seed wrapped up, though they played their starters for the contest. Tampa defeated the New Orleans Saints in their 1 o'clock contest before the Packers game, so the Packers had to come out of the game with a win.

During the first quarter, the Packers and Bears offenses exchanged possession with no scoring. The Bears forced a turnover with 5:58 left in the 1st when Donald Driver was stripped of the ball after an 8-yard reception and the fumble was recovered by the Bears.

In the second quarter, the Bears put their first and only points on the board for the day when Robbie Gould successfully converted a 30-yard field goal with 4:35 left in the half. The scoring drive was highlighted with two 20+ yard passes by Jay Cutler to WR Rashied Davis and RB Matt Forte to get them into field goal range. The teams entered into halftime of the defensive contest with the Bears holding onto a slim 3–0 lead.

After the half, the Bears started the quarter with the ball. After moving the ball into Packers territory, the Bears chose to go for it on a fourth and two at the Packers 40. Jay Cutler failed to complete a short pass to Rashied Davis and the Packers took over on downs. On the Packers' first play of the second half, Rodgers threw a deep pass intended for Greg Jennings but the pass was intercepted by CB Charles Tillman and returned to the Packers 15-yard line. The interception was challenged, but upheld. After a holding penalty and a couple of short gains by the Bears, Jay Cutler was intercepted on 3rd down in the endzone by Packers safety Charlie Peprah for a touchback.

The Packers and Bears swapped possessions and CB Tramon Williams returned the Bears punt back to the Bears 44-yard line to set the Packers up in optimal field position. Three plays into the drive, Aaron Rodgers completed a 33-yard pass to Greg Jennings down to the Bears 1-yard line. The Packers failed to score a touchdown and settled for a 23-yard field goal attempt by Mason Crosby which was successfully converted to tie the game at 3–3.

At the start of the fourth quarter, the Packers had possession and again got into the red zone, highlighted by two key plays, a 21-yard pass over the middle to Donald Driver and a 46-yard pass deep right to Greg Jennings that set up the Packers for a 1st and goal at the Bears 1-yard line for the second time of the game. This time though, the Packers scored a touchdown on 1st down when Aaron Rodgers completed a pass into the end zone to Donald Lee short right for his second 1-yard touchdown reception in two games to give the Packers a 10–3 lead with 12:46 remaining in the game.

After exchanging possessions, the Bears took over with 4:49 left in the game at the Bears 2-yard line. The Bears moved the ball into Packers territory with many short passes down to the Packers 32-yard line. Needing a touchdown to tie the game, the Bears continued to pass the ball but their drive came to an end when Cutler passed deep left to Devin Hester and the pass was intercepted by Nick Collins and returned 24 yards to the Bears 35-yard line.  The game marked the 16th time in the past 17 seasons that Green Bay had won its final regular-season game.

With the interception, the Packers sealed their victory over the rival Bears, along with the 6th seed in the NFL playoffs. The Giants later won their game against the Washington Redskins, but it was all for naught due to the Packers holding tiebreakers over the Giants and Buccaneers.

Postseason

Wild Card

    
    
    
    
    
    

Entering the postseason as the NFC's No. 6 seed, the Packers began their playoff run at Lincoln Financial Field for the NFC Wild Card game against the No. 3 Philadelphia Eagles. This was a rematch of their Week 1 win. The Packers delivered the game's opening strike in the first quarter as quarterback Aaron Rodgers found rookie tight end Tom Crabtree on a 4-yard touchdown pass. Green Bay would add onto their lead in the second quarter as Rodgers connected with wide receiver James Jones on a 9-yard touchdown pass. The Eagles answered with kicker David Akers getting a 29-yard field goal.

Philadelphia managed to cut away at their deficit in the third quarter as quarterback Michael Vick completed a 24-yard touchdown pass to wide receiver Jason Avant, but the Packers responded with Rodgers hooking up with running back Brandon Jackson on a 16-yard touchdown pass. The Eagles tried to rally as Vick got a 1-yard touchdown run (with a failed two-point conversion), but Green Bay's defense held on to preserve the victory as Tramon Williams intercepted a Michael Vick pass in the end zone with 36 seconds remaining.

With the win, the Packers improved their overall record to 11–6.

Divisional

    
    
    
    
    
    
    
    
    
    
    

Coming off their win over the Eagles, the Packers flew to the Georgia Dome for the NFC Divisional Round against the top-seeded Atlanta Falcons, in hopes to avenge their Week 12 loss.  Aaron Rodgers had arguably the greatest game of his career. He completed 31 of 36 passes for 366 yards and 4 total touchdowns. Green Bay trailed in the first quarter as Falcons running back Michael Turner got a 12-yard touchdown run.  The Packers answered in the second quarter as quarterback Aaron Rodgers found wide receiver Jordy Nelson on a 6-yard touchdown pass, but Atlanta immediately struck back as wide receiver Eric Weems returned a kickoff 102 yards for a touchdown.  Green Bay took the lead with a 1-yard touchdown run from fullback John Kuhn, followed by Rodgers finding James Jones on a 20-yard touchdown, along with cornerback Tramon Williams returning an interception 70 yards for a touchdown as time expired in the first half.

The Packers added onto their lead in the third quarter with a 7-yard touchdown run from Rodgers, followed by his 7-yard touchdown pass to Kuhn.  Atlanta tried to rally in the fourth quarter as quarterback Matt Ryan completed a 6-yard touchdown pass to wide receiver Roddy White, yet Green Bay closed out their dominating night with a 43-yard and a 32-yard field goal from Crosby. The Packers never once punted during the game.
With the win, the Packers improved their overall record to 12–6.

Green Bay's 48 points became the franchise's single-game postseason record and the 48–21 final score is also the second largest win margin in Packers playoff history.

NFC Championship

    
    
    
    
    

Coming off their win over the Falcons, the Packers flew to Soldier Field for the NFC Championship Game against their historic rival, the No. 2 seed Chicago Bears, in Round 3 of their 2010 series. This would be the second playoff meeting between the two teams, the first since falling to Chicago 33–14 in 1941.

Green Bay delivered the game's opening strike in the first quarter with a 1-yard touchdown run from quarterback Aaron Rodgers. The Packers added onto their lead in the second quarter with a 4-yard touchdown run from rookie running back James Starks. After a scoreless third quarter, the Bears answered in the fourth quarter as running back Chester Taylor got a 1-yard touchdown run. Afterwards, Green Bay struck back with nose tackle B.J. Raji returning an interception 18 yards for a touchdown. Chicago tried to rally as quarterback Caleb Hanie completed a 35-yard touchdown pass to wide receiver Earl Bennett, the Packers' defense held on to preserve the victory.

With the win, not only did they improve their overall record to 13–6, but they advanced to Super Bowl XLV (their first appearance since Super Bowl XXXII). In the process, they became the NFC's first No. 6 seed to reach the Super Bowl. They also became the 3rd NFC wild card team to reach the Super Bowl, and the first since the New York Giants in 2008.

The Packers also went 3–0 on the road in the postseason after going 3–5 on the road in the regular season, including losses in their last three road games.

Super Bowl

    
    
    
    
    
    
    
    
    

Aaron Rodgers 24/39, 304 Yds, 3 TD (Super Bowl MVP)
 Aaron Rodgers became one of only four quarterbacks in the history of the league to have at least 300 yards passing, with at least 3 touchdown passes, and no interceptions in the Super Bowl. He was unanimously voted the game's MVP.
 Rodgers also set Packer Super Bowl records for most passing yards and touchdown passes.
 Jordy Nelson set the Packer Super Bowl record for most receiving yards, with 140.
 Greg Jennings had two touchdown catches
 Donald Driver left the game in the first half with a sprained ankle
 Charles Woodson left the game after suffering a broken collarbone
 Sam Shields also left the game due to injury.

Regular season statistical leaders

 stats are correct through Week 17.

Postseason statistical leaders

 stats are correct through Super Bowl XLV.

Statistical league rankings
Total Offense (YPG): 8th
Passing (YPG): 5th
Rushing (YPG): 22nd
Points (PPG): 8th
Total Defense (YPG): 5th
Passing (YPG): 5th
Rushing (YPG): 18th
Points (PPG): 2nd
Stats correct through week 16.

Awards and records

Awards

Weekly awards
 K Mason Crosby was named NFC Special Teams Player of the Week for games played on the NFL Kickoff 2010 Weekend ( September 9, 12–13).
 OLB Clay Matthews was named NFC Defensive Player of the Week for games played on Week 2 ( September 18–20).
 CB Charles Woodson was named NFC Defensive Player of the Week for games played on Week 4 ( October 3–4).
 P Tim Masthay was named NFC Special Teams Player of the Week for games played on Week 8 (October 31, – November 1,).
OLB Clay Matthews was named NFC Defensive Player of the Week for games played on Week 9 ( November 7–8).
WR Greg Jennings was named NFC Offensive Player of the Week for games played on Week 11 ( November 18, 21–22).
QB Aaron Rodgers was named NFC Offensive Player of the Week for games played on Week 13 ( December 2, 5–6).
OLB Erik Walden was named NFC Defensive Player of the Week for games played on Week 17 (January 2,).

Monthly awards
 OLB Clay Matthews was named NFC Defensive Player of the Month for the month of September.
 QB Aaron Rodgers was named NFC Offensive Player of the Month for the month of December/January.

Annual awards
OLB Clay Matthews was named Sporting News 2010 NFL Defensive Player of the Year.
QB Aaron Rodgers was named FedEx Air NFL Player of the Year.
OG Josh Sitton was named Lineman of the Year by the NFL Alumni Association.
OT Bryan Bulaga was named to the 2010 NFL All Rookie Team.
QB Aaron Rodgers was named Super Bowl MVP for Super Bowl XLV.

Records

Team

Game
 The Packers committed a team record 18 penalties in their 20–17 loss on Monday Night Football against the Chicago Bears at Soldier Field on September 27,. The previous club record was 17 penalties against the Boston Yanks in 1945.
 The Packers scored a franchise postseason record 48 points in their 48–21 win against the Atlanta Falcons in the Divisional Round in the playoffs.
 The packers  and steelers set the record for fewest rushing attempts, game, both teams – 36, Green Bay (13) vs. Pittsburgh (23).

Season
 With the Packers never trailing in the Super Bowl, they became the first team in the Super Bowl era that never trailed by more than 7 points at any point of any game during the season.  The last team to achieve this feat was the 1962 Detroit Lions.
 The Packers were the first team in NFL history to have at least 5 losses and all of those losses being by 4 points or less.
 The Packers became the first 6th seed NFC team to win the Super Bowl and becoming the first to win it despite playing 3 straight road playoff games.
 The team's 240 points surrendered is the second best in team history.
 Aaron Rodgers became only the fourth QB in playoff history to record over 1,000 yards passing in a postseason, as well as tying the NFL playoff record for most consecutive 3 touchdown passing games and becoming the only QB to ever pass for 10 touchdowns in three straight playoff games. 
 Clay Matthews 3.5 postseason sacks are a franchise record.

Playoffs

 The Packers became the first playoff team to score a touchdown off an interception in three straight playoff games (Tramon Williams vs the Atlanta Falcons, B. J. Raji vs the Chicago Bears and Nick Collins vs the Pittsburgh Steelers).

Individual

Game
 K Mason Crosby successfully converted a team record 56-yard field goal at the end of the 1st half versus the Philadelphia Eagles on September 12, 2010. The previous Packer record was 54 yards shared by Chris Jacke, Dave Rayner and Ryan Longwell.
QB Aaron Rodgers tied Don Majkowski for third on the Most passes completed, game list with 34 passes completed vs the Chicago Bears at Soldier Field on September 27,.
RB James Starks set the Packers record for  Most yards rushing by a Rookie, Playoff game with 123 yards rushing vs the Philadelphia Eagles  at Lincoln Financial Field on January 9,.
WR Jordy Nelson set the Packers record for  Most yards receiving, Super Bowl  with 140 yards in Super Bowl XLV. The previous record was 138 yards by Max McGee in Super Bowl I.

Season
QB Aaron Rodgers tied Lynn Dickey for 2nd place on the Most Seasons, 3,000 or More Yards Passing list with 3 seasons.
QB Aaron Rodgers passed Brett Favre for 2nd place on the Most consecutive attempts, Without Interception list with 177 consecutive attempts (active streak wk 13).
QB Aaron Rodgers tied Bart Starr for most seasons with a passer rating of over 100.0 with two.
QB Aaron Rodgers' 356 rushing yards is the second most by a QB in franchise history
QB Aaron Rodgers set the franchise record for most passing yards (1,094), touchdown passes (9), and total touchdowns (11) in a postseason.
OLB Clay Matthews set the franchise record for most sacks in the first two games of the season with 6. 
OLB Clay Matthews set the franchise record for most sacks in postseason with 3.5.

Career
CB Charles Woodson set the Packers record for Most touchdowns on interceptions, career with 8 on his interception return for a touchdown vs the Detroit Lions at Lambeau Field.
OLB Clay Matthews tied three players for the Packers record of Most Seasons, 10 or More Sacks with 2.
OLB Clay Matthews tied three players for the Packers record of Most Consecutive Seasons, 10 or More Sacks with 2.

2011 Pro Bowl selections
The Packers 2011 Pro Bowl selections were announced on December 28,. The Packers initially had five players on the Pro Bowl list. These players were WR Greg Jennings, LT Chad Clifton, OLB Clay Matthews, CB Charles Woodson and S Nick Collins. CB Tramon Williams was later added as a reserve on January 20, when Philadelphia Eagles CB Asante Samuel pulled out of the Pro Bowl due to injury. The Packers also had a first alternate in QB Aaron Rodgers and four lower alternates, NT B. J. Raji, G Josh Sitton, LB A. J. Hawk and WR Donald Driver. No Packers took part in the Pro Bowl, due to their participation in Super Bowl XLV.

Notes:
: Replacement selection due to injury or vacancy.

Notes and references

External links
2010 Green Bay Packers season at ESPN
 2010 Green Bay Packers season at Pro Football Reference

Green Bay
Green Bay Packers seasons
National Football Conference championship seasons
Super Bowl champion seasons
Green